Stone Nyirenda (born 11 November 1963) is a Zambian former footballer. He competed in the men's tournament at the 1988 Summer Olympics.

References

External links
 
 

1963 births
Living people
Zambian footballers
Zambia international footballers
Olympic footballers of Zambia
Footballers at the 1988 Summer Olympics
Place of birth missing (living people)
Association football forwards
Nchanga Rangers F.C. players
K.R.C. Zuid-West-Vlaanderen players
K.S.V. Roeselare players
Royal FC Mandel United players
Zambian expatriate footballers
Expatriate footballers in Belgium